The App Quality Alliance (stylized as "AQuA") is an international organization of mobile telephony providers that aims to standardize testing and quality of  mobile device software applications.
The organization is recognized by the Institute of Electrical and Electronics Engineers through the IEEE affiliate organizations IEEE Standards Association and IEEE-ISTO.

References

External links
 

Mobile telecommunications